Parminder Singh Dhindsa is an Indian politician and belongs to the Shiromani Akali Dal (Sanyukt) Political Party. He was a member of the Shiromani Akali Dal until late 2019. He is currently MLA from Lehra and was leader of Shiromani Akali Dal Legislature group in Punjab Legislative Assembly until he quit. He was Minister for Finance & Planning (2012-2017) and Minister for Public Works (B&R) (2007-2012) in the previous Punjab Government. He is son of Rajya Sabha member Sukhdev Singh Dhindsa. He was first elected as MLA of Sunam in September 2000 by defeating Parmeshwari Devi of Congress during the by-election. He was re-elected as an MLA for the fifth consecutive term in 2017 with his tenure since 2000 to 2012 from Sunam and from 2017 onwards from Lehra Constituency. He is triumphant in his entire career since 2000.

Early life
His father Sukhdev Singh Dhindsa is MP Rajya Sabha [1998-2004, 2010–2016, 2016-till date]. He remained former Union minister for Chemicals, Fertilizers and Sports [2000-2004]. He also remained Member Of Lok Sabha from [2004-2009]. Parminder has done his MBA from Punjabi University Patiala and B.Com. from Govt. College for Men, Chandigarh. [3] He is married to Gagandeep Kaur Dhindsa who was also member of Core Committee of Shiromani Akali Dal, Women Wing.[4]

Political career
He was first appointed General Secretary of Youth Akali Dal in 1998. He was elected to the Punjab Legislative Assembly in 2000 on an Akali Dal ticket from Sunam for first time in the by-election held due to sudden demise of Bhagwan Dass Arora. He was re-elected from Sunam in 2002, 2007 and 2012. In 2007, he was made cabinet minister and given the portfolio of PWD (B&R). In 2012, he was made minister of finance.

In the state assembly elections held in 2017, Shiromani Akali Dal fielded him against former Chief Minister and five times MLA of Punjab, Rajinder Kaur Bhathal from Lehragaga's Lehra Assembly constituency. He triumphed again by defeating her with a record 26815 votes. He was MP candidate for Sangrur Constituency for the 17th Lok Sabha Elections of India but lost to Bhagwant Mann.

On 3 August 2019 he was elected leader of SAD in Punjab assembly. However, after 5 months, due to differences with party leadership he resigned from the post on 3 January 2020.

In Punjab 2022 assembly election he lost his seat of MLA. He contested as a candidate of Shiromani Akali Dal (Sanyukt) but he was defeated by Aam Aadmi Party candidate Barinder Kumar Goyal.

Electoral performance

Interest in sports 
He is the President of Cycling Federation Of India (CFI). Since 2011 [2011-2015, 2015- till date] and Executive Member of Asian Cycling Confederation. CFI is an Apex and pioneer body in the promotion of cycling sports in India affiliated to the Indian Olympic Association (IOA) and international bodies like Asian Cycling Confederation (ACC) and Union Cycliste International (UCI).

References

External links 

 
 
Parminder Singh Dhindsa Official Website

Punjabi people
Shiromani Akali Dal politicians
State cabinet ministers of Punjab, India
Punjab, India MLAs 2007–2012
Place of birth missing (living people)
Living people
Sikh politics
Finance Ministers of Punjab, India
Punjab, India MLAs 2002–2007
People from Sangrur
1973 births
Punjab, India MLAs 2017–2022